Suchitra Chandrabose is an Indian choreographer, and film director from Andhra Pradesh. She is married to lyricist Chandrabose. She also directed a film Pallakilo Pellikuthuru. She won two Nandi Awards and one Filmfare Award for Best Choreography.

She started her career as a choreographer with the film Aakhari Poratam (1988).

Filmography

Choreographer
 Aakhari Poratam - 1988
 Chaitanya - 1991
 One by two - 1993
 Money - 1993
 Gandeevam - 1994
 Theerpu - 1994
 Gharana Bullodu - 1995
 Vajram - 1995
 Sampradayam - 1996
 Ramudochadu - 1996
 Vinodam - 1996
 Abbaygari Pelli - 1997
 Annamayya - 1997
 Chinnabbayi - 1997
 Gilli Kajjalu - 1998
 Paradesi - 1998
 Shrimati Vellosta - 1999
 Sardukupodaam Randi - 2000
 Jayam Manadera - 2000
 Priyamaina Neeku - 2001
 Ninnu Choodalani - 2001
 Nuvvu Naaku Nachav - 2001
 Manasantha Nuvve - 2001
 Nuvvu Leka Nenu Lenu - 2002
 Nuvve Nuvve - 2002
 Adrushtam - 2002
 Ninne Istapaddanu - 2003
 Neeku Nenu Naaku Nuvvu - 2003
 Ela Cheppanu - 2003
 Pallakilo Pellikoothuru - 2004
 Vaana - 2008
 Jhummandi Naadam - 2010
 Gopala Gopala
 Ra Ra... Krishnayya
 Arrdham - 2021

Director 
 Pallakilo Pellikoothuru

Awards
Nandi Awards
Best Choreographer - Nuvvu Naaku Nachav (2001)
Best Choreographer - Yamaleela (1994)

Filmfare Award South
Filmfare Award for Best Dance Choreographer – South - Ooyala (1998)

References

External links

Year of birth missing (living people)
Living people
Indian women choreographers
Indian choreographers
Indian women film directors
Film directors from Andhra Pradesh
21st-century Indian women artists
Women artists from Andhra Pradesh
21st-century Indian dancers
Dancers from Andhra Pradesh